In coding theory, decoding is the process of translating received messages into codewords of a given code. There have been many common methods of mapping messages to codewords. These are often used to recover messages sent over a noisy channel, such as a binary symmetric channel.

Notation

Ideal observer decoding
One may be given the message , then ideal observer decoding generates the codeword . The process results in this solution:

For example, a person can choose the codeword  that is most likely to be received as the message  after transmission.

Decoding conventions
Each codeword does not have an expected possibility: there may be more than one codeword with an equal likelihood of mutating into the received message. In such a case, the sender and receiver(s) must agree ahead of time on a decoding convention. Popular conventions include:

 Request that the codeword be resent automatic repeat-request.
 Choose any random codeword from the set of most likely codewords which is nearer to that.
 If another code follows, mark the ambiguous bits of the codeword as erasures and hope that the outer code disambiguates them

Maximum likelihood decoding

Given a received vector  maximum likelihood decoding picks a codeword  that maximizes

,

that is, the codeword  that maximizes the probability that  was received, given that  was sent. If all codewords are equally likely to be sent then this scheme is equivalent to ideal observer decoding.
In fact, by Bayes Theorem,

Upon fixing ,  is restructured and
 is constant as all codewords are equally likely to be sent.
Therefore, 

is maximised as a function of the variable  precisely when

is maximised, and the claim follows.

As with ideal observer decoding, a convention must be agreed to for non-unique decoding.

The maximum likelihood decoding problem can also be modeled as an integer programming problem.

The maximum likelihood decoding algorithm is an instance of the "marginalize a product function" problem which is solved by applying the generalized distributive law.

Minimum distance decoding
Given a received codeword , minimum distance decoding picks a codeword  to minimise the Hamming distance:

Note that if the probability of error on a discrete memoryless channel  is strictly less than one half, then minimum distance decoding is equivalent to maximum likelihood decoding, since if

then:

which (since p is less than one half) is maximised by minimising d.

Minimum distance decoding is also known as nearest neighbour decoding. It can be assisted or automated by using a standard array. Minimum distance decoding is a reasonable decoding method when the following conditions are met:

The probability  that an error occurs is independent of the position of the symbol.
Errors are independent events an error at one position in the message does not affect other positions.

These assumptions may be reasonable for transmissions over a binary symmetric channel. They may be unreasonable for other media, such as a DVD, where a single scratch on the disk can cause an error in many neighbouring symbols or codewords.

As with other decoding methods, a convention must be agreed to for non-unique decoding.

Syndrome decoding

Syndrome decoding is a highly efficient method of decoding a linear code over a noisy channel, i.e. one on which errors are made. In essence, syndrome decoding is minimum distance decoding using a reduced lookup table. This is allowed by the linearity of the code.

Suppose that  is a linear code of length  and minimum distance  with parity-check matrix . Then clearly  is capable of correcting up to

errors made by the channel (since if no more than  errors are made then minimum distance decoding will still correctly decode the incorrectly transmitted codeword).

Now suppose that a codeword  is sent over the channel and the error pattern  occurs. Then  is received. Ordinary minimum distance decoding would lookup the vector  in a table of size  for the nearest match - i.e. an element (not necessarily unique)  with

for all . Syndrome decoding takes advantage of the property of the parity matrix that:

for all . The syndrome of the received  is defined to be:

Note that this is already of significantly less complexity than that of a standard array decoding.

However, under the assumption that no more than  errors were made during transmission, the receiver can look up the value  in a further reduced table of size

List decoding

Information set decoding 

This is a family of Las Vegas-probabilistic methods all based on the observation that it is easier to guess enough error-free positions, than it is to guess all the error-positions.

The simplest form is due to Prange: Let  be the  generator matrix of  used for encoding. Hence, if we were lucky that these  positions of the received word  contained no errors, and hence equalled the positions of the sent codeword, then we may decode.

This method has been improved in various ways, e.g. by Stern and Canteaut and Sendrier.

Partial response maximum likelihood

Partial response maximum likelihood (PRML) is a method for converting the weak analog signal from the head of a magnetic disk or tape drive into a digital signal.

Viterbi decoder

A Viterbi decoder uses the Viterbi algorithm for decoding a bitstream that has been encoded using forward error correction based on a convolutional code.
The Hamming distance is used as a metric for hard decision Viterbi decoders. The squared Euclidean distance is used as a metric for soft decision decoders.

Optimal decision decoding algorithm (ODDA) 
Optimal decision decoding algorithm (ODDA) for an asymmetric TWRC system.

See also
 Don't care alarm
 Error detection and correction
 Forbidden input

References

Further reading
 
 
 

Coding theory